New Cinema History is a movement of media historians dedicated to rewriting film history as a social history of film cultures, instead of merely an art history of the moving image. The term was coined by Richard Maltby as "a body of work that focuses on the circulation and consumption of film and examines cinema as a site of social and cultural exchange." Maltby's terminology partly aimed to institutionalize and expand to an international scale his prior decade-long collaboration with Melvyn Stokes researching Hollywood film audiences, and coincided with the formation of the HoMER Network: History of Moviegoing, Exhibition and Reception.

References

External links
HoMER Network

History of film